Akriti Kakar is an Indian singer. Her songs, "Saturday Saturday" from the film Humpty Sharma Ki Dulhania and "Iski Uski" from 2 States became popular. Akriti was a judge on Zee Bangla's Sa Re Ga Ma Pa: Li'l Champs and was going to appear on Colors (TV channel)'s Jhalak Dikhhla Jaa.

Personal life 
Kakar was born and brought up in Delhi. She has two sisters, twins Sukriti Kakar and Prakriti Kakar, who are also professional playback singers.

Kakar married director Chirag Arora in March 2016.

Track listing 
Akriti released her solo album non Bollywood playback album – "Akriti" released in April 2010 under Sony Music India. Songs were composed by Shankar Mahadevan & Akriti Kakar. The track list for the album is as follows
 Mehrmaa Ve
 Swag Wali Bride
 Gazab
 Chhoone Do
 Na Re Na Na Re
 Dil Vi Deewana
 Taabiz (Marhale)
 Chal Kaheen Sang

Akriti also released a song entitled "Ring Diamond Di" with Santosh Singh featuring Madhuri. The song was embroiled in controversy when the Music Video was allegedly plagiarised with Girls' Generation's "The Boys" and "I Got a Boy".

Playback songs 

She has also sung a song in Marathi for the film – Lagna Pahave Karun ( Marathi movie) song name is "Kasa Ha Maza Sajana". Besides these Akriti has also sung many songs in other regional languages, the song in Bengali Film Paglu has become the biggest chart buster song in Bengali films. On 12 April 2010, a solo music album "Akriti", composed by Shankar Mahadevan and Akriti, was released on Sony Music.

She also released her first single named #Kolkata Diaries. Composed by the renowned Bengali musical maestro, Joy Sarkar. The lyrics of the entire song are in Hindi written by Manoj Yadav who is popular for his songs in Coke studio and movies; but for the main hook lines that are derived from a popular Bengali folk song "Tomay Hrid Majhare Rakhibo, Chede Debo Na" that literally translate into "I am going to keep you in my heart and never let you go!".

In end of 2018, on 23 December, her new song titled "Dui Deewana" which was a duet with Sarbajit Ghosh, the writer, composer & producer of the song, was released from the musical movie MONN, under the record label of Amara Muzik. The video of the song featured Sarbajit Ghosh & model Suman Karmakar as the Leads..

TV Shows 
 She was a celebrity judge in Zee Bangla Sa Re Ga Ma Pa: Li'l Champs 2013 along with Kumar Shanu and other regional and national celebrities.
 Akriti was supposed to enter the dance show Jhalak Dikhlaa Jaa on Colors channel through wild card but sadly met with an accident while rehearsing and doctor advised complete bed-rest and hence she had to quit the show.
 In 2020, she became a judge in Zee Bangla's Sa Re Ga Ma Pa 2020 along with Mika Singh, Joy Sarkar, and Srikanto Acharya with Abir Chatterjee as host.

References

External links 
 
 

Living people
Bollywood playback singers
Indian women playback singers
Women musicians from Delhi
Singers from Delhi
21st-century Indian women singers
21st-century Indian singers
1986 births